The Irish Whale and Dolphin Group (IWDG) is a cetacean conservation and outreach organisation based in Ireland.

History
The IWDG was founded in December 1990 to establish a cetacean stranding and sighting scheme, and to campaign for the establishment of a cetacean sanctuary. In June 1991, the Irish Government responded by declaring Irish Waters to be the first European whale and dolphin sanctuary. The group was granted a charitable status in December 1999.

Organisation
The IWDG is a Limited Company with charitable status. It is guided by a number of officers, of which Dr. Simon Berrow is the current Acting CEO, who are overseen by a Board of Directors. The charity is a member of, and funded by, the Irish Environmental Network.

Current activities

Stranding and sighting scheme
One of the main activities carried out by the IWDG is the collection and storing of reported cetacean sightings and strandings in Irish waters. The complete database of reports is disseminated through the IWDG website. The main objective of this scheme was to ensure that cetacean stranding reporting was done in a geographically uniform and objective manner. Part of the scheme involves training a network of local observers through both training workshops and the provision of identification material. In the case of humpback whales, the group maintains a catalogue of fluke identification photos in order to distinguish between individuals.

Cetacean welfare
The IDWG lists the importance of engaging with external groups and promoting responsible whale watching in its mission statement. To this aim, it has released a document outline guidelines to be followed by groups who may come in contact with live cetaceans, such as fishermen, whale-watching groups and research vessels, in order to better safeguard the wellbeing of the creatures. As part of these guidelines, the group advises against swimming with cetaceans.

Cetacean conservation
The IWDG has been involved in the collection of biopsy samples from stranded large baleen whales since 2003. They have also applied for a licence to attach tracking tags to fin whales in order to determine their distribution outside of Irish waters.

Outreach

One of the stated objectives of the IWDG is to promote Ireland's suitability for observing cetaceans. In addition to engaging with the press, the group organises workshops to train members of coastal communities in the identification of cetacean species and reacting to live strandings. As part of these outreach activities, the group organises an annual Whale Watch Day to promote land-based whale watching, with the assistance of volunteers.

Vessels

RV Celtic Mist
RV Celtic Mist is a 56ft steel-hulled ketch, donated to the IWDG in 2011 by the Haughey family. The vessel underwent an EU-sponsored refit, before being relaunched in August 2012. It is used for training members in cetacean identification and monitoring, and for research projects, including the use of acoustic survey techniques. On its maiden voyage, the research vessel encountered 11 cetacean species, including blue whales.

Other vessels
Prior to obtaining use of the RV Celtic Mist, cetacean surveys were carried out by IWDG members onboard the Marine Institute's RV Celtic Voyager and RV Celtic Explorer ships for many years.

See also

 Whale watching in Ireland
 Tourism in Ireland

References

External links
 IWDG Official Website
 TEDx Talk - Pádraig Whooley, IWDG Sightings Co-ordinator

Environmental organisations based in Ireland
Animal welfare organisations based in the Republic of Ireland